Jack Egbert (born May 12, 1983) is an American former professional baseball pitcher, who played in Major League Baseball (MLB) for the Chicago White Sox and New York Mets.

Career

College
A graduate of Rutgers University, in which he was a starting pitcher for them and a two time all Big East performer, he was drafted by the Chicago White Sox in the 13th round of the 2004 MLB draft.

Chicago White Sox
Egbert began his professional career for the Rookie League Great Falls White Sox in 2004. In 17 games, in which he started nine, he had a 3.37 ERA with a 4–1 record.

In , Egbert played for the Single-A Kannapolis Intimidators. He made 24 starts in 30 games and went 10–5 with a 3.12 ERA.  Egbert pitched 6 shutout innings to clinch the Intimidators only title in franchise history and was named Pitcher of the Year. His 4 complete games were second in the South Atlantic League and he led the league with three shutouts.  

In , Egbert played for the Single-A Winston-Salem Warthogs and the Double-A Birmingham Barons. For the Warthogs, Egbert led the team in games started (25), innings pitched (140), strikeouts (120), and was also second in wins (9). With the Barons, he played in 4 games, all starts and had an 0–2 record despite an 0.86 ERA.

Egbert played the entire  season for the Barons. He led the Barons in wins (12), innings pitched (161), and was second in strikeouts (165). Egbert was also a midseason All-Star.

On November 20, 2007, the White Sox purchased his contract, protecting him from the Rule 5 draft.

Egbert made his major league debut on April 21, 2009.  After two appearances featuring 8 earned runs in 2.2 innings pitched, he was optioned back to the Triple-A Charlotte Knights of the International League on April 25, 2009.

New York Mets
On September 25, 2009, Egbert was claimed off of waivers by the New York Mets. He was designated for assignment on February 9, 2010. Egbert sat out the entire 2010 season due to Tommy John surgery. On May 25, 2012, Egbert was called up to New York, and Robert Carson was sent down to take his place. Egbert was 2–3 with a 2.08 ERA in 17 games with Triple-A Buffalo to begin the 2012 season. On October 6, 2012, Egbert elected free agency.

Personal life
Jack Egbert is from Rutherford, New Jersey and has 1 son named Jackson and coaches/coached baseball for the Concord Athletics. And in 2011 became a dad of Jackson Egbert and his son is developing as an athlete on the Concord Athletics Baseball team and is currently the head Coach/General Manager of the Concord Athletics.

References

External links

1983 births
Living people
Rutgers University alumni
Rutgers Scarlet Knights baseball players
People from Rutherford, New Jersey
Sportspeople from Staten Island
Baseball players from New York City
Major League Baseball pitchers
Birmingham Barons players
Charlotte Knights players
Chicago White Sox players
New York Mets players
Great Falls White Sox players
Winston-Salem Warthogs players
Kannapolis Intimidators players
St. Lucie Mets players
Binghamton Mets players
Buffalo Bisons (minor league) players